The FIBT World Championships 1954 took place in Cortina d'Ampezzo, Italy for the fourth time after previously hosting in 1937 (Two-man), 1939 (Four-man), and 1950.

Two man bobsleigh

Italy earned their first championship medals since World War II.

Four man bobsleigh

Medal table

References
2-Man bobsleigh World Champions
4-Man bobsleigh World Champions

IBSF World Championships
Sport in Cortina d'Ampezzo
1954 in bobsleigh
International sports competitions hosted by Italy
Bobsleigh in Italy 
1954 in Italian sport